Aloysius Paul Kelley, S.J. (born October 4, 1929) was the 7th President of Fairfield University located in Fairfield, Connecticut from 1979 to 2004.  During his 25-year tenure Father Kelley increased the full-time faculty from 151 to 220, and increased the institution's endowment from under $2 million in 1979 to $131 million by 2003.  The campus was transformed by the construction of 14 new buildings and the renovation of 12 others.

References

External links
Rev. Aloysius P. Kelley, S.J. Profile
 Rev. Aloysius P. Kelley, S.J., the 7th President of Fairfield University (1979-2004)

Presidents of Fairfield University
20th-century American Jesuits
21st-century American Jesuits
Living people
1929 births